Pasa may refer to:

People 
 Pasa of Silla, the fifth ruler of Silla, one of the Three Kingdoms of Korea
 Paşa (disambiguation), common Turkish surname and title

Titles 
 Pasha (Turkish: Paşa), an honorary title granted to officials of the Ottoman Empire

Other
Pan African Sanctuary Alliance
Pasa, Iran
Savoonga Airport, ICAO code PASA
Parachute Association of South Africa
Pāśa, a concept in Indian philosophy

See also 
 Pasha (disambiguation)